Safal Mian (also Romanized as Safal Mīān; also known as Sapal-e Mīān, Sapal Meyān, and Sapal Mīān) is a village in Zarem Rud Rural District, Hezarjarib District, Neka County, Mazandaran Province, Iran. At the 2006 census, its population was 120, in 27 families.

References 

Populated places in Neka County